William Maxwell Oppy (14 October 1924 – 25 November 2008) was an Australian rules football player who played in the Victorian Football League (VFL) between 1942 and 1954 for the Richmond Football Club. He was senior coach of Richmond in 1956.

Family
The son of James Thomas Oppy (1893–1935) and Doris Edna Oppy, née Watson (1895–1967), William Maxwell Oppy, known as "Max", was born on 14 October 1924. He was the brother of Jim Oppy and cousin of Dick Reynolds, Tom Reynolds, and murdered lawyer Keith William Allan.

Football
Oppy, who was recruited from Kew, started his career as a rover at Richmond and played in their 1943 premiership side. The following season he was pushed into defence by Jack Dyer and soon established a place in the side as a specialist back pocket, participating in a losing Grand Final at the year's end. He represented the VFL at interstate matches four times. Jack Dyer called him the "player who could not be hurt.

After retiring from football in 1954, Oppy returned to Richmond two years later and replaced Alby Pannam as senior coach. They managed just six wins, finishing in tenth position, which meant Oppy wasn't kept on in 1957.

Notes

References
 Hogan P: The Tigers Of Old, Richmond FC, Melbourne 1996

External links

Richmond Football Club – Hall of Fame

1924 births
2008 deaths
Richmond Football Club players
Richmond Football Club Premiership players
Richmond Football Club coaches
Kew Football Club players
Australian rules footballers from Victoria (Australia)
One-time VFL/AFL Premiership players
People from Maryborough, Victoria